ICG may refer to
ICG Communications
Illinois Central Gulf Railroad
Impedance cardiography, a hemorheology technique for detecting the properties of the blood flow in the thorax
Incitement to commit genocide
Indian Coast Guard
Icelandic Coast Guard
Indocyanine green
Institute of Cosmology and Gravitation, University of Portsmouth, England
Intelligence Collection Group, part of the United Kingdom's Defence Intelligence Staff
Intermediate Capital Group, a private equity and mezzanine capital firm based in London
International Children's Games, an International Olympic Committee-sanctioned sport event held every year
International Coal Group
International College for Girls, former name of IIS University
International Crisis Group, a non-profit organisation
Internet Capital Group
Inversive congruential generator
Intra-character gap (or inter-character gap) in American Morse code
Irish Continental Group, an Irish sea shipping firm
Independent Comics Group, an imprint of Eclipse Comics
International Committee on Global Navigation Satellite Systems (ICG) by United Nations Office for Outer Space Affairs
International Composers' Guild
International Cinematographers Guild
Integrated clock gating, in logic chips